Thomas Meighan (April 9, 1879 – July 8, 1936) was an American actor of silent films and early talkies. He played several leading-man roles opposite popular actresses of the day, including Mary Pickford and Gloria Swanson. At one point he commanded $10,000 per week.

Early life
Meighan was born to John and Mary Meighan in Pittsburgh, Pennsylvania. His father was the president of Pittsburgh Facing Mills, and his family was well-off.

Meighan's parents encouraged him to go to college but he refused. At the age of 15, his father sent him to work shoveling coal, which quickly changed his mind. He attended Mount St. Mary's College to study pharmacology. After three years of study, Meighan decided he wished to pursue acting.

Early theatre career
After dropping out of college in 1896, Meighan became a juvenile player in the Pittsburgh Stock Company headed by Henrietta Crosman. He was paid $35 per week.

Meighan soon found success. He first appeared on Broadway in 1900, and four years later appeared in The Two Orphans. His breakthrough role came in 1908 when he appeared with William Collier Sr. in The Dictator; this play was followed by a leading role in The College Widow, which had a successful run on Broadway in the 1907–1908 season. During this run, he met his wife Frances Ring.

Despite his film career, Meighan remained devoted to the theatre during his life.

Film career
In 1914, he entered motion pictures, at that time still in their infancy. His first film, shot in London, was titled Dandy Donovan, the Gentleman Cracksman. This led to a contract with Famous Players-Lasky. His first US film, in 1915, was The Fighting Hope. During the next two years, Meighan's career took off. In 1918, he made a propaganda film for World War I, titled Norma Talmadge and Thomas Meighan in a Liberty Loan Appeal. He then played opposite Mary Pickford in M'Liss.

Stardom

Meighan hit stardom in 1919. One of his better-known films of the period was that year's The Miracle Man, which featured Lon Chaney Sr.; it is now believed to be lost except for brief clips. This was followed with Cecil B. DeMille's Male and Female, which starred him with Gloria Swanson and Lila Lee. Most of that film's cast returned for the 1920 film Why Change Your Wife?, which co-starred Bebe Daniels. In April 1925, Meighan and Swanson produced a short film directed by Allan Dwan for the annual "Spring Gambol" for The Lambs. This film (sometimes known as Gloria Swanson Dialogue), made in Lee DeForest's sound-on-film Phonofilm process, was made as a joke for the live event, showing Swanson trying to crash the all-male club.

His popularity continued through the Roaring Twenties, during which he starred in several pictures. In 1924, he played in The Alaskan with Estelle Taylor and Anna May Wong. In 1927, Meighan starred in The City Gone Wild with Louise Brooks.

His final silents, both produced by Howard Hughes in 1928, were The Mating Call, which was critical of the Ku Klux Klan, and The Racket, which was nominated for an Academy Award for Best Picture. Both were thought lost until rediscovered in private collections in 2006; they were restored by University of Nevada, Las Vegas and shown on Turner Classic Movies.

Sound movies and career's end
Meighan's first sound feature film was The Argyle Case (1928). At this time, he was nearing 50; fearing his popularity might wane, he decided to go into real estate. It wasn't until 1931 that he returned to the screen with Young Sinners. He made four additional sound movies until illness sidelined him from acting. His last film was Peck's Bad Boy in 1934.

Personal life
Meighan commanded a salary of $5,000 per week for much of his career. At one point, it reached $10,000 per week.

Marriage

Meighan met Frances Ring (July 4, 1882 – January 15, 1951) when she was a stage actress on Broadway and he was appearing there. She was a younger sister of popular singer Blanche Ring and of vaudeville actress Julie Ring. Actor and director A. Edward Sutherland was a nephew of both Blanche Ring and Meighan. Sutherland's mother Julie was a sister of Blanche and Frances Ring.

Meighan and Ring became inseparable and soon married. They remained married until his death in 1936. Their marriage was considered happy and strong; one writer remarked "Thomas Meighan and Rin Tin Tin were the only Hollywood stars who had never seen a divorce court". The couple had no children.

Hollywood scandals
Meighan was involved in some of the more scandalous moments of silent film history, albeit as a helping hand. He was the sole witness to Jack Pickford and Olive Thomas's secretive wedding in New Jersey on October 25, 1916.

In March 1923, Douglas Gerrad, in need of help bailing his friend Rudolph Valentino out of jail for bigamy, called a fellow Irishman named Dan O'Brien who happened to be with Meighan at the time. Meighan barely knew Valentino but put up a large chunk of the bail money, and with the help of June Mathis and George Melford, Valentino was freed.

Florida
In the mid-1920s, Meighan became obsessed with Florida after talks with his realtor brother James E. Meighan. He bought property in Ocala, Florida in 1925. In 1927, he built a home in New Port Richey, Florida, where he was to spend his winters. He intended to shoot his film We're All Gamblers there; however, filming was moved to Miami.

The Meighans hoped to draw other celebrities to the area. On July 1, 1926, The Meighan Theatre opened with a screening of Meighan's movie The New Klondike. Meighan was not present but sent a congratulatory telegram.

In 1930, sound was added to the theatre. Meighan appeared this time, pushing the button to start the sound. The theatre closed in 1934, a victim of the Depression. It reopened in 1938 under the name The New Port Richey Theatre. The theatre is still open as a community playhouse, under the name Richey Suncoast Theatre.

Death
In 1934, Meighan was diagnosed with cancer. The following year, he underwent surgery at Doctors Hospital in Manhattan. He succumbed to cancer at 9:10pm on July 8, 1936, passing away at his home in Great Neck, New York. Many of his family were present. 

Meighan was originally buried at Calvary Cemetery in Queens. After resting there for almost a year, his remains were moved to a family plot at Saint Mary Cemetery in Meighan's hometown of Pittsburgh.

Legacy
 
Meighan was a large donor to various Catholic charities and the Federation for the Support of Jewish Philanthropic Societies. Many of his later films survive and have been released on DVD.

Selected filmography

Danny Donovan, the Gentleman Cracksman (1914, Short) - Dandy Donovan, the Gentleman Cracksman
Kindling (1915) - 'Honest' Heine Schultz
The Fighting Hope (1915) - Burton Temple
Out of the Darkness (1915) - Harvey Brooks
Blackbirds (1915) - Jack Doggins / Hon. Nevil Trask
The Secret Sin (1915) - Jack Herron
Armstrong's Wife (1915) - David Armstrong
The Immigrant (1915) - David Harding
Temptation (1915)
Pudd'nhead Wilson (1916) - Chambers
The Trail of the Lonesome Pine (1916) - Jack Hale
The Sowers (1916) - Prince Paul Alexis
The Clown (1916) - Dick Ordway
The Dupe (1916) - Jimmy Regan
Common Ground (1916) - Judge David Evans
The Storm (1916) - Robert Fielding
The Heir to the Hoorah (1916, directed by William C. deMille) - Joe Lacy
The Slave Market (1917) - John Barton
Sapho (1917) - Jean Gaussin
Sleeping Fires (1917) - David Gray
The Silent Partner (1917) - Edward Royle
Her Better Self (1917) - Dr. Robert Keith
The Mysterious Miss Terry (1917) - Gordon True
Arms and the Girl (1917) - Wilfred Ferrers
The Land of Promise (1917) - Frank Taylor
Madame Jealousy (1918) - Valour
Eve's Daughter (1918) - John Norton
M'Liss (1918) - Charles Gray
Missing (1918) - Sir William Farrel
Heart of the Wilds (1918) - Sergeant Tom Gellatly
In Pursuit of Polly (1918) - Colby Mason
Out of a Clear Sky (1918) - Robert Lawrence
The Forbidden City (1918) - John Worden
The Heart of Wetona (1919) - John Hardin
The Probation Wife (1919) - Harrison Wade
The Miracle Man (1919) - Tom Burke
The Thunderbolt (1919) - Bruce Corbin
Male and Female (1919) - William Crichton - The Butler
Peg o' My Heart (1919) - Sir Gerald Adair
Why Change Your Wife? (1920) - Robert Gordon
The Prince Chap (1920) - William Peyton
Civilian Clothes (1920) - Capt. Sam McGinnis
Conrad in Quest of His Youth (1920) - Conrad Warrener
Frontier of the Stars (1921) - Buck Leslie
The Easy Road (1921) - Leonard Fayne
The City of Silent Men (1921) - Jim Montgomery
White and Unmarried (1921) - Billy Kane
The Conquest of Canaan (1921) - Joe Louden
Cappy Ricks (1921) - Matt Peasley
A Prince There Was (1921) - Charles Edward Martin
The Bachelor Daddy (1922) - Richard Chester
Our Leading Citizen (1922) - Daniel Bentley, lawyer
If You Believe It, It's So (1922) - Chick Harris
Manslaughter (1922) - Daniel J. O'Bannon
The Man Who Saw Tomorrow (1922) - Burke Hammond
Back Home and Broke (1922) - Tom Redding
The Ne'er-Do-Well (1923) - Kirk Anthony
Homeward Bound (1923) - Jim Bedford
Hollywood (1923) - Thomas Meighan
Woman-Proof (1923) - Tom Rockwood
Pied Piper Malone (1924, print held Gosfilmofond) - Jack Malone
The Confidence Man (1924) - Dan Corvan
The Alaskan (1924) - Alan Holt
Tongues of Flame (1924) - Henry Harrington
Coming Through (1925) - Tom Blackford
Old Home Week (1925) - Tom Clark
The Man Who Found Himself (1925) - Tom Macauley
Irish Luck (1925) - Tom Donahue / Lord Fitzhugh
The New Klondike (1926) - Tom Kelly
Fascinating Youth (1926) - Thomas Meighan
Tin Gods (1926) - Roger Drake
The Canadian (1926) - Frank Taylor
Blind Alleys (1927) - Captain Dan Kirby
We're All Gamblers (1927) - Lucky Sam McCarver
The City Gone Wild (1927) - John Phelan
The Racket (1928) - Captain James McQuigg
The Mating Call (1928) - Leslie Hatten
The Argyle Case (1929) - Alexander Kayton
Young Sinners (1931) - Tom McGuire
Skyline (1931) - Gordon A. McClellan
Cheaters at Play (1932) - Michael Lanyard
Madison Square Garden (1932) - Bill Carley
Peck's Bad Boy (1934) - Henry Peck

References

External links

The Meighan Theatre
Photographs and literature
Photo of Meighan with his wife Frances Ring, 1920
Thomas Meighan on Broadway Internet Database

1879 births
1936 deaths
American male film actors
American male silent film actors
Male actors from Pittsburgh
Deaths from cancer in New York (state)
20th-century American male actors
Burials in Pennsylvania
The Lambs presidents